Suzanne Bocanegra is an American artist living in New York City. Her works include performance and installation art as well as visual and sound art. Her work is exhibited internationally.

Career
Bocanegra's work is held in the permanent collections of the Museum of Modern Art, Museum of Fine Arts, Boston, Tang Teaching Museum, Delaware Art Museum, and Museum of Fine Arts Houston. 
Bocanegra has received a Guggenheim Fellowship (2020), Foundation for Contemporary Arts Robert Rauschenberg award (2019), and an American Academy of Arts and Letters award in art (2021).
In 1991, Bocanegra received a Rome Prize for visual arts. She has received awards from the Pollock-Krasner Foundation (1988, 1990, 2003) and the New York Foundation for the Arts (1989, 1993, 2001, 2005).
She has received residency fellowships from MacDowell, Yaddo, and the Sharpe-Walentas Studio Program.

Recent solo shows include those at the Gund Gallery at Kenyon College (2022), Blanton Museum of Art at the University of Texas at Austin (2021), Art Cake (2019), and The Fabric Workshop and Museum (2018).

Personal life
A native of Houston, Texas, Bocanegra is an alumna of the University of Texas and the San Francisco Art Institute, from which she received a Bachelor of Fine Arts (1979) and a Master of Fine Arts (1984), respectively. She is married to composer David Lang, with whom she has three children.

Further reading

External links
Official site
Video: Artist Interview Suzanne Bocanegra on Color Chart, Tang Museum
Video: Artist Interview Suzanne Bocanegra on Little Dot, Tang Museum

References

1957 births
Living people
20th-century American women artists
21st-century American women artists
Artists from Houston
American conceptual artists
Women conceptual artists
American installation artists
National Endowment for the Arts Fellows
San Francisco Art Institute alumni
University of Texas at Austin College of Fine Arts alumni